The theory of consumer choice is the branch of microeconomics that relates preferences to consumption expenditures and to consumer demand curves. It analyzes how consumers maximize the desirability of their consumption as measured by their preferences subject to limitations on their expenditures, by maximizing utility subject to a consumer budget constraint.
Factors influencing consumers' evaluation of the utility of goods: income level, cultural factors, product information and physio-psychological factors.

Consumption is separated from production, logically, because two different economic agents are involved. In the first case consumption is by the primary individual, individual tastes or preferences determine the amount of pleasure people derive from the goods and services they consume.; in the second case, a producer might make something that he would not consume himself. Therefore, different motivations and abilities are involved. The models that make up consumer theory are used to represent prospectively observable demand patterns for an individual buyer on the hypothesis of constrained optimization.  Prominent variables used to explain the rate at which the good is purchased (demanded) are the price per unit of that good, prices of related goods, and wealth of the consumer.

The law of demand states that the rate of consumption falls as the price of the good rises, even when the consumer is monetarily compensated for the effect of the higher price; this is called the substitution effect. As the price of a good rises, consumers will substitute away from that good, choosing more of other alternatives. If no compensation for the price rise occurs, as is usual, then the decline in overall purchasing power due to the price rise leads, for most goods, to a further decline in the quantity demanded; this is called the income effect. As the wealth of the individual rises, demand for most products increases, shifting the demand curve higher at all possible prices.

In addition, people's judgments and decisions are often influenced by systemic biases or heuristics and are strongly dependent on the context in which the decisions are made, small or even unexpected changes in the decision-making environment can greatly affect their decisions.

The basic problem of consumer theory takes the following inputs:
 The consumption set C – the set of all bundles that the consumer could conceivably consume.
 A preference relation over the bundles of C. This preference relation can be described as an ordinal utility function, describing the utility that the consumer derives from each bundle.
 A price system, which is a function assigning a price to each bundle.
 An initial endowment, which is a bundle from C that the consumer initially holds. The consumer can sell all or some of his initial bundle in the given prices, and can buy another bundle in the given prices. He has to decide which bundle to buy, under the given prices and budget, in order to maximize his utility.

Behavioral economics
Behavioral economics, which contends that reality is more complex than classical consumer choice theory, has criticized neoclassical consumer choice theory. 

Firstly, Consumers use heuristics, which means they do not scrutinize decisions too closely but rather make broad generalizations. It is not worthwhile to attempt to determine the value of specific behavior. Heuristics are techniques for simplifying the decision-making process by omitting or disregarding certain information and focusing exclusively on particular elements of alternatives. While some heuristics must be utilized purposefully and deliberately, others can be used relatively effort lessly, even without our conscious awareness. Consumptions typically impacted by advertising and consumer habits. It is a mental shortcut that helps us make judgments and solve problems faster. They allow us to save time by reducing the need to constantly think about the next step. 

Secondly,  customers struggle to give standard utils and instead rank distinct options in order of preference, which he termed an ordinal utility. 

Thirdly, it is less likely a consumer would stay rational and make the choice which maximize his/her utility. Sometime, they can be irrational and may make impulsive purchases. Consumption behavior has traditionally been heavily influenced by the act of buying on the spur of the moment. The rise of the internet and social networks may cause changes in consumer behavior, resulting in more planned and sensible purchase processes. 

Fourthly, humans can be reluctant to spend cash on particular things because they have preconceived boundaries on how much they can afford to spend on 'luxuries,' according to their mental accounting. 

Lastly, it is not easy to separate products in the market. Some items, such as an electronic car or a refrigerator, are only purchased occasionally and cannot be mathematically divided.

Example: homogeneous divisible goods 
Consider an economy with two types of homogeneous divisible goods, traditionally called X and Y.
Each bundle contains a non-negative quantity of good X and a non-negative quantity of good Y.
 A typical preference relation in this universe can be represented by a set of indifference curves. Each curve represents a set of bundles that give the consumer the same utility. A typical utility function is the Cobb–Douglas function: , whose indifference curves look like in the figure below.
 A typical initial endowment is just a fixed income, which along with the prices implies a budget constraint. The consumer can choose any point on or below the budget constraint line  In the diagram.  This line is downward sloped and linear since it represents the boundary of the inequality . In other words, the amount spent on both goods together is less than or equal to the income of the consumer.

The consumer will choose the indifference curve with the highest utility that is attainable within his budget constraint. Every point on indifference curve  is outside his budget constraint so the best that he can do is the single point on  where the latter is tangent to his budget constraint.

Indifference curve analysis begins with the utility function. The utility function is treated as an index of utility. All that is necessary is that the utility index change as more preferred bundles are consumed.

On a plane with two kinds of commodities that meet the different needs of consumers, a curve composed of a series of points that consumers feel indifference becomes an indifference curve. The tangent point between the indifference curve and the budget line is the point at which consumer satisfaction is maximized.

Indifference curves are typically numbered with the number increasing as more preferred bundles are consumed. The numbers have no cardinal significance; for example, if three indifference curves are labeled 1, 4, and 16 respectively that means nothing more than the bundles "on" indifference curve 4 are more preferred than the bundles "on" indifference curve 1.

Income effect and price effect deal with how the change in price of a commodity changes the consumption of the good. The theory of consumer choice examines the trade-offs and decisions people make in their role as consumers as prices and their income changes.

As shown in the diagram I1, I2, I3 are three indifference curves. The product combinations represented by all points on I1 have the same utility to consumers. Similarly, the product combinations on I2 and I1 have the same utility to consumers. However, the utility of the product combination on the I3 curve > the utility of the product combination on the I2 curve > the utility of the product combination on the I1 curve.

Characteristics of the indifference curve 

The indifferentiated curve refers to all combinations of two goods that give the same degree of utility or satisfaction to the consumer.

Basic characteristics of the indifferentiated curve.

Because of the unsaturable nature of consumer preferences, indifferentiated curves are intensive in nature.

Because preferences are transferable, no two indifferentiated curves in the same coordinate plane can intersect.

The indifferentiated curve slopes to the right.

The indifferentiated curve is convex towards the origin.

Indifference curves usually have a negative slope, do not intersect, and are convex towards the origin (as shown in the figure above). The indifference curve has a negative slope because if the goods in one basket X and Y contain more high quality goods x, and the goods in the other basket must contain less high quality goods y in order for both baskets to give the same satisfaction and to be on the same difference curve. For example, since shopping basket X2 on the indifference curve I2 in the figure contains more good quality goods x than X1, shopping basket X2 must contain less good quality goods Y for the consumer to be on the indifference curve I2.

A positive slope curve would show that a basket with more of two goods gives the consumer the same utility or satisfaction as a basket with two goods (and no other goods). Since we're dealing with goods and not bad goods, this curve can't be an indifference curve.

Example: land 
As a second example, consider an economy that consists of a large land-estate L.
 A typical preference relation in this universe can be represented by a utility function which assigns, to each land parcel, its total "fertility" (the total amount of grain that can be grown in that land).
 A typical price system assigns a price to each land parcel, based on its area.
 A typical initial endowment is either a fixed income, or an initial parcel which the consumer can sell and buy another parcel.

Sunk cost effect 
According to the laws of economic logic, sunk costs and making decisions should be irrelevant. However, there is a widespread irrationality in people's actual investment activities, production and daily activities that takes sunk costs into account when making decisions.

Unreasonable behavior in which people recover from expenses that have already been incurred. An example of this is a consumer who has already purchased their ticket for a concert and may travel through a storm to be able to attend the concert in order to not waste their ticket.

Another example is different payment schedules for gym members may result in different levels of potential sunk costs and affect the frequency of gym visits by consumers. That is to say, the payment schedule with other less frequent (e.g., quarterly, semi-annual or annual payment schedule), compared to a month pay the fee to the gym in a larger, these factors to reduce the cost and reduce the psychological sunk costs, more vivid sunk costs significantly increased people's gym visits. Losses loom larger than gains.

Role of time constraint effect

Aside from the microeconomic theories of utility maximisation and budget constraints, there are other elements that affect the nature of consumer choice in a real-life situation. A study was conducted to measure the computational processes of subjects when faced with a decision to choose a product from a bundle of slightly differentiated products, whilst faced with a time constraint. The study was conducted through an experiment in which participants were in a supermarket-like environment and were asked to pick a snack food item from a screenshot out of a set of either 4, 9 or 16 similar items.

This decision was to be completed within a 3 second time window. Both choices and reaction times of participants were recorded, but the actual search process was recorded using eye-tracking. The study then compares three different computational process models to find the one that best explains the decision process of the consumer.

The goal of the study is to understand the computational process used by the average consumer to make these quick and seemingly meaningless purchase decisions. All three models are slight variations of widely known search models in economics. The first model represents the “optimal” model, in which there are zero search costs. I.e., the consumer looks for the maximum number of items within the time frame and picks the “best-seen” item. “Best-seen” meaning the item in which the consumer spends the most time viewing.  The second process is the “satisficing” model, wherein the consumer searches until they have found an objectively satisficing item, or they run out of time. The third and final search model is a hybrid of the optimal and satisficing models, in which they search for a random amount of time and pick the “best-seen” item. That amount of time is contingent on the value of the encountered items.

The results show that consumers are typically good at optimizing items that they have seen within the search process, i.e., they can easily make a choice from the “seen-set” of items. The results also show that consumers mostly use the hybrid model as a computational process for consumer choice. The data is most qualitatively consistent with the hybrid model rather than the optimal or satisficing models.

The conclusion to be drawn from this study is that time pressure and graphic design of consumer goods all play an important role in understanding the computational behavioural processes of consumer choice.

Effect of a price change 

The indifference curves and budget constraint can be used to predict the effect of changes to the budget constraint. Notice that because the price of X does not change, the consumer can still buy the same amount of X if he or she chooses to buy only good X. On the other hand, if the consumer chooses to buy only good Y, he or she will be able to buy less of good Y because its price has increased.

As shown on the diagram below, that curve is I1, and therefore the amount of good Y bought will shift from Y2 to Y1, and the amount of good X bought to shift from X2 to X1.

If these curves are plotted for many different prices of good Y, a demand curve for good Y can be constructed. The diagram below shows the demand curve for good Y as its price varies. Alternatively, if the price for good Y is fixed and the price for good X is varied, a demand curve for good X can be constructed.

Income effect 

Another important item that can change is the money income of the consumer.  The income effect is the phenomenon observed through changes in purchasing power. It reveals the change in quantity demanded brought by a change in real income.
Graphically, as long as the prices remain constant, changing income will create a parallel shift of the budget constraint. Increasing the income will shift the budget constraint right since more of both can be bought, and decreasing income will shift it left.

Depending on the indifference curves, as income increases, the amount purchased of a good can either increase, decrease or stay the same.  In the diagram below, good Y is a normal good since the amount purchased increased as the budget constraint shifted from BC1 to the higher income BC2.  Good X is an inferior good since the amount bought decreased as the income increases.

Price effect as sum of substitution and income effects

Every price change can be decomposed into an income effect and a substitution effect; the price effect is the sum of substitution and income effects.

The substitution effect is the change in demands resulting from a price change that alters the slope of the budget constraint but leaves the consumer on the same indifference curve. In other words, it illustrates the consumer's new consumption basket after the price change while being compensated as to allow the consumer to be as happy as he or she was previously. By this effect, the consumer is posited to substitute toward the good that becomes comparatively less expensive. In the illustration below this corresponds to an imaginary budget constraint denoted SC being tangent to the indifference curve I1. Then the income effect from the rise in purchasing power from a price fall reinforces the substitution effect.  If the good is an inferior good, then the income effect will offset in some degree the substitution effect.  If the income effect for an inferior good is sufficiently strong, the consumer will buy less of the good when it becomes less expensive, a Giffen good (commonly believed to be a rarity).

The total effect of the price drop on quantity demanded is the sum of the substitution effect and the income effect.

Indifference curves for goods that are perfect substitutes or complements

Perfect Substitutes 
A perfect substitute is a good or service which can be used in exactly the same way as the good or service it replaces. Products which are perfect substitutes for one another will exhibit straight lines on the indifference curve. This demonstrates that the relative utility of one good is equivalent to the relative utility of the other, regardless of their quantity. An example of perfect substitutes could be Coca Cola compared to Pepsi Max. A consumer who considers these products as perfect substitutes will be indifferent to spending all of their budget on strictly one or the other.

Perfect Complements 
A perfect complement is a good or service whose appeal increases with the popularity of its complement. The relationship between both goods x and y are naturally dependent on each other along with the concept of consumption being dependent upon other consumption. Products that are perfect complements will be demonstrated graphically on an indifference curve with two lines at perfect right angles to one another. This demonstrates that the demand and consumption of one good is inherently tied to the other. i.e. when the consumption of one good increases, as does the consumption of the complementary good. An example of complementary goods are school kid's tuition fees and their school uniforms. When the consumer spends money on their child's tuition fees they are more than likely to complement the purchase with the school uniform.

Utility 
The usefulness of a good is also a factor that consumers consider when making their choices. A product that has utility meets the Consumer needs and brings help to the consumer. The product itself has value. A utility is a set of numerical values that reflect the relative rankings of various bundles of goods.

Utility function - the relationship between utility values and every possible bundle of goods: U(Z, B),

U=√BZ

Caution: Utility ≠ Happiness

Marginal Utility:

In economists, Utility is provided by the value of customers buying each good. When people buy additional goods and gain extra satisfaction or happiness it is called Marginal utility.

The additional utility derived from consuming an additional unit of an goods or service is known as marginal utility.

The marginal utility function of good Z is:

MUz=△U/△Z

Assumptions 
The behavioral assumption of the consumer theory proposed herein is that all consumers seek to maximize utility. In the mainstream economics tradition, this activity of maximizing utility has been deemed as the "rational" behavior of decision makers. More specifically, in the eyes of economists, all consumers seek to maximize a utility function subject to a budgetary constraint. In other words, economists assume that consumers will always choose the "best" bundle of goods they can afford. Consumer theory is therefore based on generating refutable hypotheses about the nature of consumer demand from this behavioral postulate.

In order to reason from the central postulate towards a useful model of consumer choice, it is necessary to make additional assumptions about the certain preferences that consumers employ when selecting their preferred "bundle" of goods. These are relatively strict, allowing for the model to generate more useful hypotheses with regard to consumer behavior than weaker assumptions, which would allow any empirical data to be explained in terms of stupidity, ignorance, or some other factor, and hence would not be able to generate any predictions about future demand at all. For the most part, however, they represent statements which would only be contradicted if a consumer was acting in (what was widely regarded as) a strange manner. In this vein, the modern form of consumer choice theory assumes:

Consumer choice theory is based on the assumption that the consumer fully understands his or her own preferences, allowing for a simple but accurate comparison between any two bundles of good presented. That is to say, it is assumed that if a consumer is presented with two consumption bundles A and B each containing different combinations of n goods, the consumer can unambiguously decide if (s)he prefers A to B, B to A, or is indifferent to both. The few scenarios where it is possible to imagine that decision-making would be very difficult are thus placed "outside the domain of economic analysis". However, discoveries in behavioral economics has found that actual decision making is affected by various factors, such as whether choices are presented together or separately through the distinction bias.

Preferences are complete
Completeness - when a consumer is faced with a choice between any two goods A and B, they must rank them so that only one of the followings is true: the consumer prefers the good A to good B, the consumer prefers good B to good A, or the consumer is indifferent between the goods.
                Either A ≥ B or B ≥ A (or both) for all (A,B).
Preferences are reflexive
Means that if A and B are in all respect identical the consumer will consider A to be at least as good as (i.e. weakly preferred to) B. Alternatively, the axiom can be modified to read that the consumer is indifferent with regard to A and B.
Preference are transitive
If A is preferred to B and B is preferred to C then A must be preferred to C.
This also means that if the consumer is indifferent between A and B and is indifferent between B and C she will be indifferent between A and C.
This is the consistency assumption. This assumption eliminates the possibility of intersecting indifference curves.
                If A ≥ B and B ≥ C, then A ≥ B(for all A, B, C).
Preferences exhibit non-satiation
More Is Better - all else being the same, more of a commodity is better than less of it (non-satiation). This is the "more is always better" assumption; that in general if a consumer is offered two almost identical bundles A and B, but where B includes more of one particular good, the consumer will choose B.
In other words, this theory assumes that a consumer will never be completely satisfied, as they will always be happier consuming a little bit more.
Among other things this assumption precludes circular indifference curves. Non-satiation in this sense is not a necessary but a convenient assumption. It avoids unnecessary complications in the mathematical models.
Indifference curves exhibit diminishing marginal rates of substitution
This assumption assures that indifference curves are smooth and convex to the origin.
This assumption is implicit in the last assumption.
This assumption also set the stage for using techniques of constrained optimization. Because the shape of the curve assures that the first derivative is negative and the second is positive.
The MRS tells how much y a person is willing to sacrifice to get one more unit of x.
This assumption incorporates the theory of diminishing marginal utility. This theory of diminishing marginal utility states that the added satisfaction experienced by a consumer  from having one additional unit of a good or service will diminish. In other words, the marginal utility of each additional unit will decline. An example of this can be illustrated by a consumer who orders several coffees throughout the course of a day. The marginal utility experienced by the first beverage will be greater than the second. The marginal utility experienced by the second beverage will be greater than the third, and so on.
Goods are available in all quantities
It is assumed that a consumer may choose to purchase any quantity of a good (s)he desires, for example, 2.6 eggs and 4.23 loaves of bread. Whilst this makes the model less precise, it is generally acknowledged to provide a useful simplification to the calculations involved in consumer choice theory, especially since consumer demand is often examined over a considerable period of time. The more spending rounds are offered, the better approximation the continuous, differentiable function is for its discrete counterpart. (Whilst the purchase of 2.6 eggs sounds impossible, an average consumption of 2.6 eggs per day over a month does not.)

Note the assumptions do not guarantee that the demand curve will be negatively sloped. A positively sloped curve is not inconsistent with the assumptions.

Use value 
In Marx's critique of political economy, any labor-product has a value and a use value, and if it is traded as a commodity in markets, it additionally has an exchange value, most often expressed as a money-price. Marx acknowledges that commodities being traded also have a general utility, implied by the fact that people want them, but he argues that this by itself tells us nothing about the specific character of the economy in which they are produced and sold.

Labor-leisure tradeoff 

One can also use consumer theory to analyze a consumer's choice between leisure and labor. Leisure is considered one good (often put on the horizontal axis) and consumption is considered the other good. Since a consumer has a finite amount of time, he must make a choice between leisure (which earns no income for consumption) and labor (which does earn income for consumption).

The previous model of consumer choice theory is applicable with only slight modifications. First, the total amount of time that an individual has to allocate is known as his "time endowment", and is often denoted as T. The amount an individual allocates to labor (denoted L) and leisure (ℓ) is constrained by T such that

A person's consumption is the amount of labor they choose multiplied by the amount they are paid per hour of labor (their wage, often denoted w). Thus, the amount that a person consumes is:

From this labor-leisure tradeoff model, the substitution effect and income effect from various changes caused by welfare benefits, labor taxation, or tax credits can be analyzed.

See also 
 Buyer decision process
 Convex preferences
 Consumer sovereignty
 Consumerism
 Important publications in consumer theory
 Indifference curves
 Microeconomics
 Opportunity cost
 Producer theory – the dual of consumer theory
 Supply and demand
 Utility maximization problem

References

 
 
 Salvatore. (2008). CHAPTER 3 Consumer Preferences and Choice. pp.62-63.

External links
 

 
Family economics
Utilitarianism
Decision theory